The Ohrenspitzen are three peaks on the border between Tyrol, Austria, and South Tyrol, Italy. They are a part of the Rieserferner Group in the Central Eastern Alps.

References

External links 

Mountains of the Alps
Mountains of Tyrol (state)
Mountains of South Tyrol
Alpine three-thousanders
Rieserferner Group
Austria–Italy border
International mountains of Europe
Rieserferner-Ahrn Nature Park
Geography of East Tyrol